William Arthur Cristall (September 12, 1875 - January 28, 1939) was a  Major League Baseball pitcher who played with the Cleveland Indians in 1901. Cristall batted and threw left-handed. His playing height and weight were listed as 5 foot 7 inches and 145 lbs. He was Jewish.

Baseball career
Cristall made his major league debut on September 3, 1901. His time in the major leagues was short, as he only started and pitched in six career games. His career numbers were not so impressive, as his win-loss record would be 1–5, although he did pitch 5 complete games and his one win was a shutout. Although he had very few at bats, he was a respectable hitter, especially for a pitcher, as he had 7 hits in 20 at-bats, including two hits for triples, and finished with a career .350 batting average.

Cristall finished his career with a fielding percentage of .957, making only one error in his six starts. His last game would be on September 28, 1901. He was the first professional baseball player to be born in Ukraine, and is one of only three players in Major League history, (the other two being Reuben Ewing and Izzy Goldstein) to have been born in Ukraine. He is also the only Ukrainian baseball player to record a victory, a strikeout, a walk, a win, a loss, a complete game, a shutout, and a hit batter in major league history. He died on January 28, 1939, in Buffalo, New York.

References

External links

1875 births
1939 deaths
American expatriate baseball players in Canada
American people of Ukrainian-Jewish descent
Appleton Papermakers players
Albany Senators players
Alton Blues players
Chatham Reds players
Cleveland Blues (1901) players
Evansville River Rats players
Hamilton Blackbirds players
Harrisburg Senators players
Jewish American baseball managers
Jewish American baseball players
Jewish Major League Baseball players
Major League Baseball pitchers
Major League Baseball players from Ukraine
Memphis Egyptians players
Minor league baseball managers
Montgomery Senators players
New Orleans Pelicans (baseball) players
Oakland Clamdiggers players
Oswego Grays players
Rome Romans players
Jews from the Russian Empire
Ukrainian Jews
Schenectady Electricians players
Scranton Miners players
Sportspeople from Odesa
Syracuse Stars (minor league baseball) players
Toledo Mud Hens players
Toronto Maple Leafs (International League) players
Troy Trojans (minor league) players
Williamsport Millionaires players
Woodstock Bains players
Worcester Farmers players